The following page is an alphabetical section from the list of PC games.

Numerical

References

List0